Anjireh (also Romanized as Anjīreh; also known as Anjīrak, Anjīreh-ye Now, and Anjīrvand) is a village in Bafruiyeh Rural District, in the Central District of Meybod County, Yazd Province, Iran. At the 2006 census, its population was 11, in 5 families.

References 

Populated places in Meybod County